Şehmus Hazer (born February 15, 1999) is a Turkish professional basketball player for Fenerbahçe Beko of the Turkish Basketball Super League (BSL) and the EuroLeague.

Professional career
On August 6, 2020, Hazer joined Beşiktaş on a 3-year contract. He had a productive season with Beşiktaş, as he averaged 14.9 points per game in Turkish Basketball Super League.

In August 2021, Hazer joined the Cleveland Cavaliers for the NBA Summer League.

On 12 September 2021, Hazer signed a 3-year contract with Fenerbahçe Beko beginning from the 2021-2022 season.

References

External links

Şehmus Hazer Basketball Champions League Profile
Şehmus Hazer TBLStat.net Profile
Şehmus Hazer Eurobasket Profile
Şehmus Hazer TBL Profile

Living people
1999 births
Bandırma B.İ.K. players
Beşiktaş men's basketball players
Fenerbahçe men's basketball players
Shooting guards
Turkish men's basketball players